is a private university in Awaji, Hyōgo, Japan. The school was established in 2006 as Junshin-kai University of Nursing and Health. The school adopted the present name in 2008.

External links
 Official website 

Educational institutions established in 2006
Private universities and colleges in Japan
Universities and colleges in Hyōgo Prefecture
2006 establishments in Japan
Awaji, Hyōgo
Nursing schools in Japan